Emily Mabel Tustin (25 March 1884 – 9 September 1967) was a New Zealand photographer. Her portraits of people and bridal parties are held in the collection of Museum of New Zealand Te Papa Tongarewa.

Biography 
Tustin was born on 25 March 1884, the daughter of Harriet Elizabeth Tustin (née Pilcher) and William George Tustin. She grew up in Wellington and attended The Terrace School and Wellington Technical School. She ran her portrait photography business from premises in central Wellington—initially on Lambton Quay and later on Courtney Place—from 1921 to the mid-1940s. She also exhibited her photographs at the annual Wellington Winter Show.

Tustin died in Wellington in 1967, and her ashes were buried at Karori Cemetery.

References

1884 births
1967 deaths
New Zealand women photographers
People from Wellington City
Burials at Karori Cemetery